On 1 July 1985, in an attack that had targeted the American Trans World Airlines offices in Madrid, Spain, the British Airways offices in the floor below were bombed, killing a woman and wounding 27 people, most of them Spanish. The bombing was followed up minutes later when gunmen opened fire with submachine guns on the Alia Royal Jordanian Airline offices some hundred yards away, injuring two people by shattered glass. Up to three grenades were thrown at the office, but failed to explode or were defused.

Responsibility for the attack was immediately claimed by an Arabic-speaking caller in Beirut claiming to represent the "Organization of the Oppressed" in response to Ronald Reagan having threatened to strike at terrorists following the recent hijacking of TWA Flight 847 (claimed by a similarly named Hezbollah-linked front), and linked to Reagan's intervention on 30 June to have the remaining 39 American hostages released. The attack was also linked to the recent sentencing in Spain of two Shiites to 23 years in prison for the attack on a Libyan diplomat the previous year.

The attacks have been attributed by several sources to the Abu Nidal Organization.

See also
 El Descanso bombing
 1985 Frankfurt airport bombing
 1985 Rome and Vienna airport attacks

References

Airline office attacks
1985 murders in Spain
Abu Nidal attacks
Airline office attacks
Attacks on office buildings
British Airways accidents and incidents
Improvised explosive device bombings in 1985
Airline office attacks 
July 1985 crimes
July 1985 events in Europe
Airline office attacks
Palestinian terrorist incidents in Europe
Reagan administration controversies
Royal Jordanian accidents and incidents
Terrorist incidents in Spain in 1985
Trans World Airlines accidents and incidents
Building bombings in Spain